Włodzimierz Staniewski (born in 1950 in Bardo, Poland) is a Polish theatre and film director, founder and director of the Gardzienice Centre for Theatre Practices. Author of international programmes, actor training, essays, and plays.

Awards

1990: Diploma from the minister of foreign affairs for the Gardzienice Centre for Theatre Practices for its contribution to promoting Polish culture abroad
1991: Konrad Swinarski Award for Włodzimierz Staniewski and the group for the establishment and activity of the Gardzienice Centre for Theatre Practices
1999: First prize for the performance "Metamorfozy" / "Metamorphoses" based on Apuleius, at the MESS International Theatre Festival in Sarajevo
2002: Knight's Cross of  the Order of Polonia Restituta
2005: Silver Medal for Merit to Culture – Gloria Artis
Meritorious Activist of Culture

References 

 Paul Allain.   Gardzienice. Polish Theatre in transition.  England, USA: Harwood Academic Publisher 1997.
 Alison Hodge.   Twentieth Century Actor’s Training.  London, New York: Routledge 2000.
 Staniewski, Włodzimierz with Hodge, Alison.  Hidden Territories.  London: Routledge 2004. 
 Filipowicz, Halina.  Expedition into Culture: The Gardzienice (Poland).  The Drama Review: TDR, Vol. 27, No. 1, New European and U. S. Theatre (Spring, 1983), pp. 54–71.
 Filipowicz, Halina.  Demythologizing Polish Theatre.  Source: TDR, Vol. 39, No. 1 (Spring, 1995), pp. 122–128
 Filipowicz, Halina.  Gardzienice: A Polish Expedition to Baltimore.  The Drama Review: TDR, Vol. 31, No. 1 (Spring, 1987), pp. 137–163.
 Filipowicz, Halina.  Polish Theatre after Solidarity: A Challenging Test.  TDR Vol. 36, No. 1 (Spring, 1992), pp. 70–89
 Staniewski, Włodzimierz.  Monograph Archive: Gardzienice, Poland.  Exeter: Arts Documentation Unit, 1993.
 Centre for Theatre Practices "Gardzienice" website
 Biography on e-teatr.pl

1950 births
Living people
Polish theatre directors
Polish educators
Recipient of the Meritorious Activist of Culture badge